is a Japanese manga artist that usually works as the illustrator in collaboration with a writer. He is best known for Crying Freeman (1986–1988), written by Kazuo Koike, and Heat (1999–2004), written by Buronson. The latter won the 2001 Shogakukan Manga Award for general manga. Ikegami received the Fauves d'Honneur at the 2023 Angoulême International Comics Festival. Yoshihide Fujiwara is a former assistant of Ikegami's.

Career
After graduating from junior high school, Ikegami moved to Osaka and drew manga while working as a billboard sign painter, debuting at the age of 17 writing rental comics. In 1966, he published a story called  in the gekiga magazine Garo that caught the eye  of fellow Garo contributor, Shigeru Mizuki, who offered him a job as his assistant. Ikegami accepted and moved to Tokyo where he worked as Mizuki's assistant for two and a half years. From a young age Ikegami had admired Takao Saito and Yoshiharu Tsuge, so he was delighted to work with Tsuge as Mizuki's assistant. Ikegami is also a fan of American comics, particularly Neal Adams.

Ikegami has worked on several popular series, such as Mai, the Psychic Girl with writer Kazuya Kudo, Crying Freeman, with writer Kazuo Koike, as well as Sanctuary and Heat with writer Sho Fumimura. He also wrote and drew Spider-Man: The Manga, a manga version of Spider-Man and collaborated with Garon Tsuchiya for the manga Box.

In 2001, he won the Shogakukan Manga Award for general manga as the artist of Heat. He became a professor at Osaka University of Arts in 2005.

From 2016 to 2020, he and Sho Fumimura created Begin in Big Comic Superior. Ikegami teamed up with writer Richard Woo for M no Shirushi -MacArthur Ansatsu Keikaku- (2020) for Big Comic Superior. It tells the story of a plot to assassinate Douglas MacArthur.

A character called Kēichi Kurata (played by Masataka Kubota) in the TV-drama GeGeGe no Nyōbō is modeled after him. He did a collaboration manga for the anime Girls und Panzer.

Selected works
  (1970–1971): Written by Kōsei Ono and Kazumasa Hirai
  (1973–1977): Written by Kazuo Koike, serialized in general-interest magazine Shūkan Gendai
  (1974–1979): Written by Tetsu Kariya, serialized in Weekly Shōnen Sunday
  (1980–1982): Written by Tetsu Kariya, serialized in Weekly Shōnen Sunday
  (1981–1986): Written by Kazuo Koike
  (1985–1986): Written by Kazuya Kudō, serialized in Weekly Shōnen Sunday
  (1986–1987): Written by Kazuya Kudō
  (1986–1988): Written by Kazuo Koike
  (1990–1991): Written by Kazuo Koike
  (1990–1995): Written by Sho Fumimura
  (1991–1992): Written by Oji Hiroi
  (1996–1998): Written by Buronson
  (1998–2004): Written by Buronson
  (2000–2004)
  (2004–2011): Written by Buronson
  (2013–2015): Written by Buronson
  (2015–2016) — Written by Hideo Yamamoto
 Begin (2016–2020): Written by Sho Fumimura
  (2020–present):  Written by Riichiro Inagaki

References

External links 

 Ryoichi Ikegami Official Website (Japanese)
 Ryoichi Ikegami entry on lambiek
 Jason Thompson's article about the Spider-man manga
 The Illustrious Career of Ryoichi Ikegami

 
1944 births
Inkpot Award winners
Living people
Manga artists from Fukui Prefecture
Gekiga creators